Adoxophyes dubia is a species of moth of the family Tortricidae. It is found in Japan, where it has been recorded from southern Honshu, Shikoku, Kyushu and Okinawa.

The length of the forewings is 8 mm for males and 9 mm for females. The forewings of the males are pale ochreous with bright brown markings. The hindwings are pale greyish-ochreous, becoming yellowish towards the apex. Females have light ochreous-yellow forewings and glossy greyish-ochreous hindwings.

The larvae feed on Lyonia and Ribes species.

References

Moths described in 1998
Adoxophyes
Moths of Japan